Guillaume de Marcillat (ca. 1470–1529) was a French painter and stained glass artist.

Biography

He was born in La Châtre, Indre about 1470.  He was in Rome by 1509, where he was employed by the popes Julius II and Leo X in the Vatican and at Santa Maria del Popolo, where the two windows in the choir are his earliest surviving works. In 1515, he was summoned by Cardinal Silvio Passerini to Cortona, where he established a workshop, that produced stained glass windows for the Madonna del Calcinaio Cathedral.  By 1519 he was in Arezzo, where he produced windows for the Cathedral of Arezzo and the Basilica of San Francesco.  He also painted biblical frescos in the vault of the  Cathedral of Arezzo.

He died in Arezzo, Italy in 1529.

References 
 Henry, Tom, "Centro e Periferia": Guillaume de Marcillat and the Modernisation of Taste in the Cathedral of Arezzo", Artibus et Historiae, Vol. 15, No. 29 (1994), 55–83.
 Vasari, Giorgio, Le Vite delle più eccellenti pittori, scultori, ed architettori, many editions and translations.

1470 births
1529 deaths
People from Indre
15th-century French painters
French male painters
16th-century French painters
French stained glass artists and manufacturers